Punta Integrated School formerly known as Punta National High School is a public high school in Punta, Calamba, Laguna, Philippines. It offers both junior high school (grades 7–10) and senior high school (grades 11–12).

References

High schools in Laguna (province)
Schools in Calamba, Laguna
1971 establishments in the Philippines
Educational institutions established in 1971